Martial Arts Stadium is a station on the Orange line of Kaohsiung MRT in Lingya District, Kaohsiung, Taiwan.

Station overview

The station is a two-level, underground station with an island platform and four exits. The station is 201 meters long and is located on Jhongjheng 1st Rd across from Martial Art Stadium, other sporting facilities nearby include the Olympic Pool, Sports Stadium and Extreme Sports Arena.

Station layout

Exits
Exit 1: Jhongjheng 1st Rd., Furen Rd., Jhongjheng Elementary School, Martial Arts Stadium (west), Kaohsiung Japanese School, Kaohsiung Guandi Temple, Wumiao Market
Exit 2: Jhongjheng 1st Rd., Mingde St., Kaohsiung Extreme Sports Ground, Fu'an Park, Kaohsiung City Local Office of Bureau of Labor Insurance
Exit 3: Jhongjheng 1st Rd., Wuying Rd., Chungcheng Stadium, Sports Development Bureau, Kaohsiung City Government
Exit 4: Jhongjheng 1st Rd., Martial Arts Stadium (east), Kaohsiung International Swimming Pool, Zhengdao Park

Around the station
 Jhongjheng Rd. Interchange, National Highway No. 1
 Chung Cheng Martial Arts Stadium
 Chungcheng Stadium
 Jhongjheng Park
 Kaohsiung Japanese School

References

2008 establishments in Taiwan
Kaohsiung Metro Orange line stations
Lingya District
Railway stations opened in 2008